The following is a timeline of the history of the city of Nizhny Novgorod, Russia.

Prior to 20th century

 1221 – Nizhny Novgorod "founded by Vladimir princes as outpost against Mordvinians and Volga Bulgars."
 1227 –  built.
 1330 – Pechersky Ascension Monastery founded (approximate date).
 1370 – Convent of the Annunciation founded.
 1393 – Nizhny Novgorod becomes part of the Grand Duchy of Moscow.
 1515 – Nizhny Novgorod Kremlin built.
 1631 –  rebuilt.
 1719 – Stroganov church built.
 1817 – Annual Nizhny Novgorod Fair begins.
 1822 –  built.
 1849 – Nizhny Novgorod Machine Factory established.
 1862 – Nizhny Novgorod railway station opens.
 1867 – Population: 40,742.
 1868 - Alexander Nevsky Cathedral construction begins.
 1871 - Steamship Perevorot built and joined the Steamboats on the Volga River. 
 1881 – Population: 57,530.
 1884 – 7 July: Ethnic unrest.
 1896 – All-Russia Exhibition 1896 held; Shukhov Rotunda built.
 1897 – Population: 98,503.

20th century

 1909 – Kozma Minin newspaper begins publication.
 1913 – Population: 112,300.
 1917 – Nizhny Novgorod State Technical University founded.
 1918
 N. I. Lobachevsky State University of Nizhny Novgorod
 Nizhny Novgorod Radio Laboratory established.
 1920 – Nizhny Novgorod State Medical Academy established.
 1926 – Population: 222,356.
 1929
 Shukhov Towers erected.
 Nizhny Novgorod Oblast created.
 Sormovo becomes part of city.
 1931 – Avtozavodsky City District established.
 1932
 City renamed "Gorky."
 Gorky Automobile Plant established.
 Lokomotiv Stadium opens.
 1939 – Population: 644,116.
 1941-1943 – Bombing of Gorky.
 1946 – Russian Federal Nuclear Center established.
 1947 - Nizhny Novgorod Research Institute of Radio Engineering founded.
 1963 – FC Volga Nizhny Novgorod (football club) formed.
 1965
  built.
 Population: 1,085,000.
 1970 – Sovetsky City District established.
 1979 – Population: 1,367,000.
 1985 – Nizhny Novgorod Metro begins operating.
 1989 – Population: 1,438,133.
 1990 – Nizhny Novgorod Chamber of Commerce established.
 1991 – Boris Nemtsov becomes governor of Nizhny Novgorod Oblast.
 1992 – GAZ privatized.
 1994
 Nizhny Novgorod International Airport in operation.
 Ivan Petrovich Sklyarov becomes mayor.
 2000 – City becomes part of the Volga Federal District.

21st century

 2002 – Burevestnik (Nizhny Novgorod Metro) opens.
 2010 – Population: 1,250,619.
 2012 – Nizhny Novgorod cable car to Bor begins operating.
 2015 - FC Nizhny Novgorod founded.
 2016 – 70th Anniversary of Victory Plant built.
 2017 – Bor bridge II built.
 2018 - Nizhny Novgorod Stadium opened.

See also
 Nizhny Novgorod history
 History of Nizhny Novgorod
 Other names of Nizhny Novgorod
 Timelines of other cities in the Volga Federal District of Russia: Kazan, Samara

References

This article incorporates information from the Russian Wikipedia.

Bibliography

 
 
 
 
 
 
 
 
  (About Nizhny Novgorod)

External links

Years in Russia
Nizhny Novgorod